Naval flag signalling covers various forms of flag signalling, such as semaphore or flaghoist, used by various navies; distinguished from maritime flag signalling by merchant or other non-naval vessels or flags used for identification.

History
Naval flag signalling undoubtedly developed in antiquity in order to coordinate naval action of multiple vessels.  In the Peloponnesian War (431 – 401 BCE) squadrons of Athenian galleys were described by Thucydides as engaging in coordinated maneuvers which would have required some kind of communication; there is no record of how such communication was done but flags would have been the most likely method.

Flags have long been used to identify a ship's owner or nationality, or the commander of a squadron.  But the use of flags for signalling messages long remained primitive, as indicated by the 1530 instruction that when the Admiral
doth shote of a pece of Ordnance, and set up his Banner of Council on Starrborde bottocke of his Shippe, everie shipps capten shall with spede go aborde the Admyrall to know his will.
Several wars with the Dutch in the 17th century prompted the English to issue instructions for the conduct of particular fleets, such as (in 1673) the Duke of York's "Instructions for the better Ordering of His Majesties Fleet in Sayling".  Signals were primitive and rather ad hoc ("As soon as the Admiral shall loose his fore-top and fire a gun..."), and generally a one-way communication system, as only flagships carried a complete set of flags.  In 1790 Admiral Lord Howe issued a new signal book for a numerary system using numeral flags to signal a number; the number, not the mast from which the flags flew, indicated the message. Other admirals tried various systems; it was not until 1799 that the Admiralty issued a standardized signal code system for the entire Royal Navy.  This was limited to only the signals listed in the Signal-Book.  In 1800 Captain Sir Home Popham devised a means of extending this: signals made with a special "Telegraph" flag refererred to a separate dictionary of numbered words and phrases. A similar system was devised by Captain Marryat in 1817 "for the use of vessels employed in the merchant service".

Marryat's Code of Signals and various competitors have been supplanted by the International Code of Signals (ICS) for general maritime use.  Most navies now use the flags of the ICS for 26 letters A through Z, sometimes augmenting them with additional flags for other national characters.  But they retain additional flags for naval usage (such as related to maneuvering or status), and use their own codes.  E.g., in the ICS the single flag Mike means the vessel is stopped; in the U. S. Navy it means the duty medical officer is on board.

Flaghoist was the only way ships could signal prior to the advent of radio and blinking light.  Even now it is often the preferred method of signalling messages of local significance.  A radio message that "[ship's call sign] is fueling, everyone stand clear" is incomplete without information as to where the ship is; it is also distracting for many remote parties that are not affected, and congests the radio channel.  Flying the Bravo flag is complete information: "danger, stand clear of here".  It also communicates to all local parties, including personnel in the vicinity, or in passing small boats that do not have radios.  Similarly, a radio message to the effect "this is the admiral, follow me" could lead to disaster if anyone mistook which ship the admiral is on.

Flag examples

Numerals

Substitutes
These flags indicate a repeat of the first, second, etc., flag in that hoist.

Sample flag meanings 
Despite the NATO sharing the same alphabetic flags as the International Code of Signals, the meanings are not shared between the codes. Furthermore, the NATO code uses a number of special flags which alter the meaning of the hoist. All below signals have been taken from a 2003 unclassified NATO codebook.

See also 
Bravo Zulu
Bunting tosser
England expects that every man will do his duty (a famous flag signal).
Maritime flag signalling
Semaphore
Signal lamp
International Code of Signals
Russian Navy Code of Signals
Japanese Navy Signal Flags

Notes

Sources

External links 
Royal Navy Signal Flags and Pendants
Sea Flags (Joseph McMillan)
Historic Modes of Naval Communication (Captain Howeth)
Flag Signalling at Sea (Captain Barrie Kent) 
NATO flags (Flags of the World)
Signal flags of the Imperial Japanese Navy (World War II).
Russian signalling flags.
Signalman 3 & 2 manual used to train U.S. Navy signalmen; detailed coverage of procedure.

Emergency communication
Signalling
Naval warfare
Signal flags